While I Run This Race is a 1967 American short documentary film about poverty in the United States directed by Edmond Levy.  It was nominated for an Academy Award for Best Documentary Short.

See also
 Charlton Heston filmography

References

External links

, posted by the Lyndon Baines Johnson Library and Museum
While I Run This Race at the National Archives and Records Administration

1967 films
1967 documentary films
American short documentary films
American independent films
1960s short documentary films
Documentary films about poverty in the United States
1967 independent films
1960s English-language films
1960s American films